James P. Howard, II,   is an American mathematician at the Johns Hopkins Applied Physics Laboratory, where he works as a data scientist and statistician.

Early life 

Howard was born in Dayton, Ohio and attended schools in southwest Ohio.  He studied mathematics at the University of Maryland, College Park, environmental science at the Johns Hopkins University, and public policy at the University of Baltimore.  He earned his doctorate in 2014 in public policy from the University of Maryland, Baltimore County.  His research focused on the economic costs of the National Flood Insurance Program.

Career 

He is a scientist at the Johns Hopkins Applied Physics Laboratory where his work focuses on data science.  In addition, he has led research projects on blockchain, augmented reality, and public health. Howard also maintains the R package phonics for managing phonetic spellings in R.

Howard joined the Board of Appeals for Howard County in 2011, where he has taken part in several controversial land use decisions.  In addition, Howard has been a member of the Maryland Defense Force since 2006, where he has served as information management chief. He also served as a member of the Howard County Charter Review Commission in 2019 recommending changes to make redistricting independent and insulate decisions from political influence.  Howard ran for the Maryland House of Delegates in 2018 and ran for delegate to the 2020 Democratic National Convention pledged to Elizabeth Warren.

Awards 

 Fellow of the British Computer Society

Books 

 Teaching and Learning Mathematics Online, co-edited with John F. Beyers, CRC Press, New York, 2020, 
 Handbook of Military and Defense Operations Research,  co-edited with Natalie M. Scala, CRC Press, New York, 2020, 
 Computational Methods for Numerical Analysis with R, CRC Press, New York, 2017, 
 Socioeconomic Effects of the National Flood Insurance Program, Springer, Cham, Switzerland, 2016,

Game credits 

 Designer, GURPS Disasters: Hurricane, Steve Jackson Games, 2019

References

External links 

 
 Campaign website

Date of birth missing (living people)
1979 births
21st-century American mathematicians
Data scientists
Fellows of the British Computer Society
GURPS writers
Living people
Johns Hopkins University alumni
People from Columbia, Maryland
R (programming language) people
Senior Members of the IEEE
University of Maryland, College Park alumni
University of Maryland, Baltimore County alumni
University of Baltimore alumni